St. Clair County Airport  is a public use airport located three nautical miles (6 km) southeast of the central business district of Pell City, in St. Clair County, Alabama, United States. It is owned by the St. Clair County Airport Authority. According to the FAA's National Plan of Integrated Airport Systems for 2009–2013, it is categorized as a reliever airport for the Birmingham-Shuttlesworth International Airport.

Facilities and aircraft 
It has one runway designated 3/21 with an asphalt surface measuring 5,001 by 80 feet (1,524 x 24 m).

For the 12-month period ending January 22, 2009, the airport had 34,572 aircraft operations, an average of 94 per day: 97% general aviation and 3% military. At that time there were 81 aircraft based at this airport: 85% single-engine, 12% multi-engine, 1% helicopter and 1% ultralight.

Sammie's Touch-n-Go restaurant is located on the north end of the airport.

Holder Aviation, an avionics repair and installation company, is based at the airport.

References

External links 
 Saint Clair County Airport
 Aerial image as of 6 March 1997 from USGS The National Map
 Airfield photos for PLR from Civil Air Patrol
 

Airports in Alabama
Transportation in St. Clair County, Alabama
Buildings and structures in St. Clair County, Alabama